The 2014 Waratah Cup was the 12th season of Football NSW's knockout competition in the state of New South Wales, Australia, which ran from 15 March to 6 July. Clubs entered from the top four divisions of the State League (including the recently established National Premier Leagues NSW), as well as teams from various other amateur Associations.

The winners were Blacktown City, their 4th title (including the Statewide Cup competition).

The competition also served as Qualifying Rounds for the 2014 FFA Cup. The four semi-finalists qualified for the final rounds of the 2014 FFA Cup, entering at the Round of 32. The four losing quarter-finalists then competed in a separate playoff event to determine the remaining three qualifiers.

First round
A total of 64 teams took part in this stage of the competition, comprising 9 teams from the State League Division 2, and 55 teams from other amateur Associations that successfully applied. All matches in this round were completed by 16 March 2014.

Second round
A total of 32 teams took part in this stage of the competition. All matches in this round were completed by 23 March 2014.

Third round
A total of 40 teams took part in this stage of the competition. 12 Clubs from the NPL Division 2 and 12 Clubs from the State League Division 1 entered into the competition at this stage. All matches in this round were completed by 9 April 2014.

Fourth round
A total of 32 teams took part in this stage of the competition. 12 Clubs from the National Premier Leagues NSW entered into the competition at this stage. All matches in this round were completed by 23 April 2014.

Fifth Round
A total of 16 teams took part in this stage of the competition. All matches in this round were completed by 8 May 2014.

Quarter finals
A total of 8 teams took part in this stage of the competition. The four victorious teams in this round qualified for the 2014 FFA Cup Round of 32. Matches in this round were played on 21 May 2014.

Playoff rounds 

Separate from the main fixtures of the Waratah Cup, three of the four losers of the quarter-final fixtures also took part in further matches as part of the 2014 FFA Cup Qualifiers.

Sydney United 58, Hakoah Sydney City East, and Parramatta FC all qualified for the 2014 FFA Cup Round of 32.

Semi finals

A total of 4 teams took part in this stage of the competition. Matches in this round were played on 11 June 2014.

Final
The 2014 Waratah Cup Final was held at the neutral venue of Lambert Park on 6 July 2014.

References

2014 in Australian soccer
Waratah Cup